In analytical chemistry, cross-validation is an approach by which the sets of scientific data generated using two or more methods are critically assessed. The cross-validation can be categorized as either method validation or analytical data validation.

See also
 Validation (drug manufacture)
 Verification and validation

References

Analytical chemistry